Otites guttatus is a species of ulidiid or picture-winged fly in the genus Otites of the family Ulidiidae.

This species was originally named Ortalis guttata but that name is now used for the speckled chachalaca, a species of bird.

References

guttatus
Diptera of Europe
Insects described in 1830